Driedger is a surname. People with this surname include:

Albert Driedger (born 1936), Canadian politician
Chris Driedger (born 1994), Canadian ice hockey goaltender
Elmer Driedger (1913–1985), Canadian lawyer
Herold Driedger (born 1942), Canadian politician
Myrna Driedger (born 1952), Canadian politician

Russian Mennonite surnames